29 pairs from 20 nations competed in women's doubles.

Seeds
 (gold medalists)
 (silver medalists)
 (bronze medalists)
 (bronze medalists)

Results

Top Half

Bottom Half

Finals

References

External links 
 Women's doubles draws and results at the 1992 Summer Olympics - InternationalBadminton.org

Badminton at the 1992 Summer Olympics
Olymp
Women's events at the 1992 Summer Olympics